The 2016–17 Coastal Carolina Chanticleers men's basketball team represented Coastal Carolina University during the 2016–17 NCAA Division I men's basketball season. The Chanticleers, led by tenth-year head coach Cliff Ellis, played their home games at the HTC Center in Conway, South Carolina as first-year members of the Sun Belt Conference. They finished the season 20–19, 10–8 in Sun Belt play to finish in a three-way tie for sixth place. As the No. 8 seed in the Sun Belt tournament, they defeated South Alabama before losing to Texas–Arlington in the quarterfinals. They received an invitation to the College Basketball Invitational where they defeated Hampton, Loyola (MD) and UIC to advance to the best-of-three finals series against Wyoming where they lost 2 games to 1.

Previous season
The Chanticleers finished the 2015–16 season 21–12, 12–6 in Big South play to finish in a tie for second place. The season marked the Chanticleers final season in the Big South. They lost in the quarterfinals of the Big South tournament to Gardner–Web. They received an invitation to the CollegeInsider.com Tournament where they defeated Mercer, New Hampshire, and Grand Canyon to advance to the semifinals. In the semifinals, the Chanticleers lost to UC Irvine.

Roster

Schedule and results

|-
!colspan=9 style=| Non-conference regular season

|-
!colspan=9 style=| Sun Belt Conference regular season

|-
!colspan=9 style=| Sun Belt tournament

|-
!colspan=9 style=| CBI

References

Coastal Carolina Chanticleers men's basketball seasons
Coastal Carolina
Coastal Carolina